Francesco Martino (14 July 1900 – 10 October 1965) was an Italian gymnast and Olympic champion. He was born and died in Bari.

Martino competed in the 1924 Summer Olympics in Paris where he received gold medals in rings and in team combined exercises.

At the 1924 Games, he also participated in the following events:

 horizontal bar - eleventh place
 rope climbing - 13th place
 parallel bars - 15th place
 individual trap - 16th place
 pommel horse - 28th place
 sidehorse vault - 44th place
 vault - 57th place

References

External links
 

1900 births
1965 deaths
Sportspeople from Bari
Italian male artistic gymnasts
Olympic gymnasts of Italy
Olympic gold medalists for Italy
Gymnasts at the 1924 Summer Olympics
Olympic medalists in gymnastics
Medalists at the 1924 Summer Olympics
Gymnasts of Marina Militare